Divya Dhayal is an archer from India. She became the national archery champion at age 15 She has represented India at world archery youth championship, archery world cups, international archery tournaments and other international archery events

She started her early archery training at the Army Sports Institute. in Pune and later at other places, under  Col. Vikram S. Dhayal

Early life and education 
Dhayal, born in Bareilly, comes from an Army family. Her father Col. Vikram S Dhayal is an army officer.

Career 

Divya started her archery journey at the age of 13 years in 2014.

National 

She won the Senior National Archery Championship in 2017 by winning the individual gold and mixed team gold.

International 

She started playing as an International player by participating in the World Cup as a compound archer and has played for India since 2016.

Personal life 
She received the Indian Sports Honours and has two siblings Khushbu Dhayal and Digvijay Dhayal. She studies at the Army Public School, Pune.

References

External links 
 
  at World Archery Federation

Year of birth missing (living people)
Living people
Indian female archers